The MAC Commonwealth, in full Middle Atlantic Conference Commonwealth, is an intercollegiate athletic conference affiliated with the NCAA's Division III. It is one of the three conferences that operate under the umbrella of the Middle Atlantic Conferences; the others being the MAC Freedom and the Middle Atlantic Conference, a grouping used for some sports that consists of MAC Commonwealth and MAC Freedom schools. Member institutions are located in Pennsylvania and Maryland.

Member schools

Current members
The MAC Commonwealth currently has nine full members, all are private schools. The most recent changes to the MAC took place in 2020. First, the MAC announced in April 2019 that York College of Pennsylvania would join from the Capital Athletic Conference in 2020. The following month, the MAC announced that upon York's arrival, the MAC Commonwealth and MAC Freedom would be realigned so that each would have 9 members. Eastern moved from the MAC Freedom to the MAC Commonwealth, while Arcadia and Lycoming moved in the opposite direction. With the departure of Lycoming and Wilkes from both the MAC Freedom and the overall MAC, Lebanon Valley will move to MAC Freedom to balance the membership numbers.

Notes

Enrollment source:

Former members
The MAC Commonwealth had six former full members, all were private schools:

Notes

Membership timeline

Sports

The MAC Commonwealth sponsors intercollegiate athletic competition in men's baseball, men's and women's basketball, women's field hockey, men's golf, men's and women’s soccer, women's softball, men's and women's tennis, and women's volleyball.  In addition, members also compete in the Middle Atlantic Conference in men's and women's cross country, men's football, men's and women's ice hockey, men's and women's lacrosse, men's and women's swimming, men's and women's indoor and outdoor track and field, men's volleyball, and men's wrestling.

Footnotes

References

External links